Derek Harrison (5 March 1944 – 15 May 2018) was a British cyclist. He competed in the individual road race and team time trial events at the 1964 Summer Olympics.

References

External links
 

1944 births
2018 deaths
British male cyclists
Olympic cyclists of Great Britain
Cyclists at the 1964 Summer Olympics
Sportspeople from Birmingham, West Midlands